The Friedrichshafen G.IV and G.V (factory designations FF.61 and FF.55) respectively were heavy bombers that were designed and manufactured in Germany during World War I by Flugzeugbau Friedrichshafen. The G.IV saw limited use by the Luftstreitkräfte (German Imperial Air Service) for tactical and limited strategic bombing operations, while the G.V and a follow-on design, the FF.62 did not fly until after the Armistice.

Development
Although the G.III series had proven to be successful, Friedrichshafen engineers began to work on a replacement aircraft during 1917. Faced with the fact that any successor would have to be powered by the same 190 kW (260 hp) Mercedes D.IVa engine as the G.III series, engineers decided to increase performance by trying to lighten the aircraft. In part this was achieved by completely removing the nose gunner's position. Another major change was that the twin engines were now arranged in a tractor configuration for the first time. Two basic versions of this bomber were produced; the G.IV which had a similar tail unit as the G.III, while the G.IVa had a tail unit similar to that of the G.IIIa and G.IIIb. Other than modifications to the fuselage and tail surfaces to account for the change in the aircraft's center of gravity the G.IV series aircraft were roughly similar to the G.III series aircraft. Little is known of the wartime career of the G.IV and G.IVa. Two batches of these bombers were ordered from Friedrichshafen and Daimler and some of them were delivered before the war ended. While it is certain that some examples of the improved Friedrichshafen G.IV were delivered it is not clear how many they were or whether they saw service at the front.

The G.V was generally similar to the G.IVs, and featured a similar box-like tail unit. It differed, however, in having an even shorter forward fuselage, so that the nose of the aircraft was now behind the propeller discs. This allowed the engines to be moved closer to the aircraft's centreline, making asymmetrical thrust less of a problem in the case of the failure of one of its engines. A single prototype flew on 9 May 1918, but it was not put into production. The FF.62 did not fly until 20 November, and was generally similar except for reverting to Mercedes D.IVa in place of the new Maybach Mb IVa engines used on the G.V.

Operators
 
 Luftstreitkrafte

Specifications (G.IV)

See also

References

Bibliography

Further reading
 
 

1910s German bomber aircraft
G.IV
Aircraft first flown in 1918